The Ministry of Education Services is the Sri Lankan government ministry.

List of ministers

The Minister of Education Services is an appointment in the Cabinet of Sri Lanka.

Parties

See also
 List of ministries of Sri Lanka

References

External links
 Government of Sri Lanka

Education Services
Education Services